The 1928 Texas Tech Matadors football team represented Texas Technological College—now known as Texas Tech University—as an independent during the 1928 college football season. In their fourth and final season under head coach Ewing Y. Freeland, the Matadors compiled a 4–4–1 record and were outscored by opponents by a combined total of 79 to 47. The team played its home games at Tech Field.

Schedule

References

Texas Tech
Texas Tech Red Raiders football seasons
Texas Tech Matadors football